The Littleblack Nunataks are a group of about a dozen black nunataks at the southeast side of Byrd Névé in Antarctica. The group was charted and descriptively named by the New Zealand Geological Survey Antarctic Expedition, 1960–61.

References

Nunataks of Oates Land